The Panamanian records in swimming are the fastest ever performances of swimmers from Panama, which are recognised and ratified by the Federación Panameña de Natación (FPN).

All records were set in finals unless noted otherwise.

Long Course (50 m)

Men

Women

Mixed relay

Short Course (25 m)

Men

Women

Mixed relay

References

External links
 FPN web site

Panama
Records
Swimming
Swimming